Dad Camp is a reality TV show on VH1. The show, created by Michael Krupat and Chris Wylde, documents six pregnant couples as they undergo boot camp style group therapy, to help motivate the men to take up the responsibility of fatherhood. At the end of the show, each woman will decide if she wants her partner to stay and help raise the baby, or if she wants sole custody of the child. The couples were: Elliott Miller and Tiffany, Aaron Tyler and Shell, Wes Thompson and Cheryl, Austin Gurley and Candace Hendricks, Donta Young and Briana Stone, and Brian Merrill and Christina Rubert.

Episodes

References

External links

2010 American television series debuts
2010s American reality television series
2010 American television series endings
VH1 original programming
English-language television shows